Isthmiade necydalea is a species of beetle in the family Cerambycidae. It was described by Carl Linnaeus in his landmark 1758 10th edition of Systema Naturae.

References

Isthmiade
Beetles described in 1758
Taxa named by Carl Linnaeus